Gillian Zucker (born April 21, 1969) is an American sports executive, currently serving as the president of business operations of the Los Angeles Clippers of the National Basketball Association.  Prior to her hiring by the Clippers, Zucker served nine years (2005 to 2014) as the president of the Auto Club Speedway, a NASCAR-sanctioned race track in Fontana, California, approximately 55 miles east of Los Angeles.

Los Angeles Clippers
Although the team had a female executive, Patty Simmons  (an acquaintance of then-team owner Donald Sterling), briefly working in the basketball operations side of the team when the franchise was located in San Diego, Zucker’s hire by the Clippers is the team’s first serious and qualified hiring of a top-level female executive.  When she was hired by the Clippers on November 6, 2014, Zucker effectively replaced long-time team executive Andy Roeser, who not only ran the business side of the team, but also played in role in basketball operations, particularly handling player contract negotiations on behalf of Sterling and the team.  Zucker’s role with the Clippers is more defined, as she handles the team’s business dealings, ticketing, marketing, and sponsorships.  The hiring of Zucker was the first major hire under the ownership of Clippers' current team owner, Steve Ballmer, and she was among approximately thirty candidates that interviewed for the position of president of business operations.  Under her new presidency, Zucker was called-on by Ballmer to oversee the new identity package created for the team, which was officially introduced to the public on June 17, 2015.  Zucker, Ballmer, head coach and president of basketball operations Doc Rivers, and the team’s long-time play-by-play announcer Ralph Lawler were among those affiliated with the team that gave out free merchandise with the new insignia to fans throughout greater Los Angeles.

Auto Club Speedway
While at the Auto Club Speedway, Zucker and her team initiated aggressive marketing towards children and minority groups to boost tickets and merchandising sales at the race track.  Because of that, she was honored by Fox Sports and MSN as one of the most of the powerful women in motor sports.  Also while with the Auto Club Speedway, she worked on the management team of parent company International Speedway Corporation, also overseeing operations at their race tracks in Joliet, Illinois (Chicagoland Speedway) and Kansas City, Kansas (Kansas Speedway).  However, even despite Zucker’s best efforts, attendance at Auto Club Speedway gradually declined (as it was also reflective at most NASCAR tracks as a whole), and as a result, the Auto Club Speedway lost a Sprint Cup race (Pepsi Max 400), and they had to decrease its seating capacity from 92,000 to 68,000.  Prior to working for the Auto Club Speedway, Zucker worked as the vice president of business and development at the Daytona International Speedway, as well as being the assistant general manager of the Durham Bulls baseball team, the currently Triple-A farm team of the Tampa Bay Rays.  She also worked for other minor league baseball teams in various capacities, including for the following teams: High Desert Mavericks, Springfield Sultans, and Lansing Lugnuts.

Personal life
Zucker is a 1990 graduate of Hamilton College in Clinton, Oneida County, New York, receiving a bachelor of arts degree while majoring in creative writing and religious studies, and currently resides in the Brentwood section of Los Angeles.  She is a board member for the Los Angeles Sports Council, California Chamber, Los Angeles Sports and Entertainment Commission, Young Presidents Organization, and California Travel and Tourism Commission.  Zucker is also a commissioner for the board that oversees the Los Angeles Convention Center, as she was appointed by Eric Garcetti, the mayor of Los Angeles.

References

1969 births
Living people
Los Angeles Clippers
Los Angeles Clippers executives
National Basketball Association executives
National Basketball Association team presidents
NASCAR people
Hamilton College (New York) alumni
People from Brentwood, Los Angeles
Women basketball executives